Ruth Hart (1893 – 2 May 1952), was an American actress. She appeared in 35 films between 1909 and 1938.

She died in New York, New York, United States.

Selected filmography
Nursing a Viper (1909)
The Woman from Mellon's (1910)

External links

1893 births
1952 deaths
American film actresses
American silent film actresses
20th-century American actresses